Heggen is a surname. Notable people with the surname include:

Almar Heggen (1933–2014), Norwegian opera singer
Belinda Heggen, Australian journalist
Joan Heggen, American mayor
Tamara Heggen (born 1976), Australian figure skater
Thomas Heggen (1918–1949), American writer